A security bag is a heavy duty bag used  to contain high-value products or documents or legally sensitive items.  Envelopes with security features are called security envelopes as well as security bags.  Cash for deposit in a bank is often placed in a special deposit bag with security features. When used to contain items related to a crime, special  evidence bags are used. Authentication of signatures and chain of custody are often required.

Construction
Security bags or envelopes may be specially designed plastic bags, paper bags, or fabric bags. Bags or envelopes can be made to be tamper resistant to make it difficult for unauthorized entry; often it is more important for these to be tamper evident, to indicate when an unauthorized entry has occurred.

Bags and envelopes are often closed by an integral pressure sensitive adhesive on the closing flap; removal of a release liner allows convenient closing of the bag. Several types of security features can be included in the flap structure which are designed to irreversibly indicate opening.

Separate security tapes are also used. Tamper-indicating security seals employ a variety of mechanisms for operation, each with its own advantages and disadvantages.

Documentation such as labels for certified signatures for custody and chain-of-custody labels are frequently included.

Use
No one security feature can be considered as "tamper proof".  Layers of TR and TE features, as well as the broader security systems are needed to provide better assurance of security.  All security products can be foiled by a knowledgeable person with sufficient time and with access to specialized tools, solvents, extreme temperatures, other security bags, security tapes, etc.

See also
Currency packaging
Dye pack
 Evidence management
 Provenance
Package pilferage
Security seal
 Traceability

Notes

References

 Rosette, J L, ”Improving Tamper-Evident Packaging: Problems, Tests and Solutions", 1992
 Yam, K.L., "Encyclopedia of Packaging Technology", John Wiley & Sons, 2009, 

Bags
Evidence
Theft
Security
Security technology
Envelopes
Money containers